The 2011 Spanish GP2 Round was the second round of the 2011 GP2 Series season. It was held on May 20–22, 2011 at Circuit de Catalunya, Montmeló, Spain, supporting the 2011 Spanish Grand Prix.

Classification

Qualifying

Notes
 – Jules Bianchi was handed a ten grid position penalty for ignoring yellow flags during the session.
 – Julián Leal was handed a ten grid position penalty for causing a collision in Turkish Sprint Race.

Feature Race

Notes
 – Romain Grosjean was excluded from race results after it was found that the driver’s car did not comply with the technical regulations.

Sprint Race

Notes
 – Esteban Gutiérrez was handed a ten place grid penalty for causing a collision during the Feature Race.

Standings after the round

Drivers' Championship standings

Teams' Championship standings

 Note: Only the top five positions are included for both sets of standings.

See also 
 2011 Spanish Grand Prix
 2011 Catalunya GP3 Series round

References

External links
GP2 Series official website: Results

Catalunya
Catalunya GP2